The Pimienta Formation is a geologic formation in Mexico. It preserves fossils dating back to the Tithonian-Berriasian. The formation is considered laterally equivalent to the La Casita Formation. The Metriorhynchid Cricosaurus vignaudi is known from the formation.

See also 

 List of fossiliferous stratigraphic units in Mexico

References

External links 
 

Geologic formations of Mexico
Jurassic Mexico
Jurassic System of North America
Tithonian Stage